"Soul Kind of Feeling" was a single released in August 1984 by Australian soul music group Dynamic Hepnotics from their album Take You Higher.  It was their highest charting hit, which appeared on the Australian Kent Music Report Singles Chart in October 1984 and peaked at No. 5. In 1986, "Soul Kind of Feeling" won the APRA Music Award for 'Most Performed Australasian Popular Work'.

"Soul Kind of Feeling" was written by lead singer, Robert Susz. The 12-inch single version, "Soul Kind of Feeling (12" Hepno Mix)" was remixed and extended from the earlier 7-inch single. Both were issued on Mushroom Records' White Label Records. In 1998, Mushroom released a three-track CD version.

The music video was directed by Fiona Cochrane.

Other uses

The song featured prominently in the background in Australian soap opera Neighbours until the early nineties. The song was also performed in an episode of Home and Away by 
Dan Baker (Tim Campbell), at the reception of his wedding to Leah Patterson (Ada Nicodemou).

Track listing
7" single version
 "Soul Kind of Feeling" (Robert Susz) – 3:54
 "Last to Know" (Andrew Silver) – 2:40

12" single version
 "Soul Kind of Feeling (12" Hepno Mix)" – 5:07
 "Last to Know" – 2:40

CD version
 "Soul Kind of Feeling" – 3:54
 "Last to Know" – 2:40
 "Gotta Be Wrong (Way to Love)" (Robert Susz) – 4:06

Credits and personnel
Dynamic Hepnotics

Credited to:

 Bruce Allen – saxophone
 Allen Britton – bass guitar
 Andrew Silver – guitar
 Robert Souter – drums
 Robert Susz – vocals, harmonica
 Ian Dixon - trumpet, piccolo trumpet (guest)

Production
 Producer – Mark Sydow, Dynamic Hepnotics
 Engineer – Tony Cohen recorded at Alberts, Sydney
 Mixing engineer – John Bee mixed at EMI Studios 301, Sydney
 Remixer – John Bee, Mark Sydow (for 12" version)

Charts

Weekly charts

Year-end charts

References

1984 singles
1984 songs
APRA Award winners
Dynamic Hepnotics songs